This article is a list of released and unreleased music recordings resulting from the collaborations of members of The Clutch, a collective of songwriters.

2005

2006

2007

Amerie – Because I Love It – Columbia
02. "Hate2LoveU" (Mi Marie, Candice Nelson, Balewa Muhammad, Ezekiel Lewis, J. Que)
 Produced by One Up Entertainment (Loren Hill, Rich Shelton & Kevin Veney), co-produced by Amerie & Len Nicholson

Bobby Valentino – Special Occasion (Circuit City Edition) – Def Jam / DTP
02. "Anonymous" (featuring Timbaland) (Mosley, Logan, Harmon, Candice Nelson, Balewa Muhammad, Ezekiel Lewis, J. Que)
 Additional vocals by Candice Nelson
05. "Rearview (Ridin')" (featuring Ludacris) (Mosley, Logan, Harmon, Candice Nelson, Balewa Muhammad, Ezekiel Lewis, J. Que, Bridges)
 Both Produced by Timbaland, co-produced by The Royal Court (King Logan & Jerome Harmon)
17. "Let's Go" (Richard, Candice Nelson, Keri Hilson, Balewa Muhammad, Ezekiel Lewis, J. Que, Morrow, Wilson)
 Produced by Don Vito & The Clutch, co-produced by Mitrxxx The Mad Scientist
00. "Pull It Off" (non-album track) (Mosley, Logan, Harmon, Candice Nelson, Balewa Muhammad, Ezekiel Lewis, J. Que)
 Produced by Timbaland, co-produced by The Royal Court (King Logan & Jerome Harmon)

Jennifer Lopez – Brave – Epic
02. "Forever" (Hollis, Candice Nelson, Balewa Muhammad, Ezekiel Lewis, J. Que)
 Produced by Hit-Boy & The Clutch
 Background vocals by Candice Nelson
 Additional vocals by Ezekiel Lewis
11. "Wrong When You're Gone" (Baker, Candice Nelson, Keri Hilson, Balewa Muhammad, Ezekiel Lewis, J. Que) (+ Demo by Keri Hilson)
 Produced by Bigg D & The Clutch
 Background vocals by Keri Hilson
12. "Brave" (Karlsson, Winnberg, Candice Nelson, Balewa Muhammad, Ezekiel Lewis, J. Que) (+ Demo by Candice Nelson)
 Produced by Bloodshy & Avant & The Clutch
 Background vocals by Candice Nelson

Ciara – Ciara: The Evolution – Jive / LaFace
01. "That's Right" (Harris, Smith, Candice Nelson, Balewa Muhammad, Cameron, Jefferson)
 Produced by Lil Jon
02. "Like a Boy" (Harris, Kenon, Candice Nelson, Balewa Muhammad, Ezekiel Lewis, J. Que)
Produced by Calvo Da Gr8, co-produced by The Clutch & Ciara
08. "My Love" (Harris, Kennedy, Collins, Candice Nelson, Balewa Muhammad)
 Produced by Brian Kennedy, co-produced by Antwoine "T-Wizz" Collins & Ciara
 Background vocals by Candice Nelson
16. "So Hard" (Harris, Cox, Dean, Candice Nelson, Balewa Muhammad, Clark)
 Produced by Bryan-Michael Cox, co-produced by Kendrick "WyldCard" Dean
 Background vocals by Candice Nelson

Keke Palmer – So Uncool – Atlantic
02. "Joystick (The Game Song)" (Edwards, Jr., Candice Nelson, Keri Hilson, Balewa Muhammad, Ezekiel Lewis, J. Que)

03. "Music Box" (Edwards, Jr., Candice Nelson, Balewa Muhammad, Ezekiel Lewis, J. Que)
 Both Produced by Bernard "Focus..." Edwards, Jr.
00. "Too Many Pictures" (non-album track) (Hudson, Candice Nelson, Balewa Muhammad, Ezekiel Lewis, J. Que)
 Produced by Eric Hudson
00. "Dress Code" (non-album track) (Rotem, Candice Nelson, Balewa Muhammad, Ezekiel Lewis, J. Que)
 Produced by J.R. Rotem

Katharine McPhee – Katharine McPhee – RCA
03. "Open Toes" (McPhee, Hills, Candice Nelson, Balewa Muhammad, DioGuardi)

00. "Neglected" (Original Version) (McPhee, Hills, Balewa Muhammad, Candice Nelson)
 Album Version replaces Candice Nelson section with one written by Kara DioGuardi.

00. "Vegas" (non-album track) (Hills, Candice Nelson, Keri Hilson, Balewa Muhammad)

00. "Don't Tell Me" (non-album track) (McPhee, Hills, Candice Nelson, Balewa Muhammad)
 All Produced by Danja Handz

Timbaland – Timbaland Presents Shock Value  – Interscope / MMG / Blackground
04. "The Way I Are" (featuring Keri Hilson & D.O.E.) (Mosley, Hills, Keri Hilson, Maultsby, Candice Nelson, Balewa Muhammad) (+ Radio Version featuring Sebastian)
 Writers: Candice Nelson – Timbaland verses, Keri Hilson – all performed sections, Balewa Muhammad – Timbaland chorus sections
 Produced by Timbaland, co-produced by Danja Handz

00. "Your Cover's Blown" (featuring Keri Hilson) (non-album track) (Mosley, Keri Hilson, Candice Nelson)
 Produced by Timbaland

00. Other TBD non-album tracks

Kevin Michael – Kevin Michael – Atlantic / Downtown
06. "Hood Buzzin'" (Karlsson, Winnberg, Wallbert, Candice Nelson, Balewa Muhammad, Ezekiel Lewis, J. Que)
 Produced by Bloodshy & The Clutch
09. "Ghost" (S. Taylor, Candice Nelson, Balewa Muhammad, Ezekiel Lewis, J. Que)
 Produced by Shea Taylor & The Clutch
 Background vocals by Candice Nelson
11. "Weekend Jumpoff" (Rotem, Candice Nelson, Balewa Muhammad, Ezekiel Lewis, J. Que)
 Produced by J.R. Rotem & The Clutch
00. "Better Late" (non-album track) (J. Que, Ezekiel Lewis)

Mario – Go! – J
07. "No Definition" (Mosley, Logan, Harmon, Candice Nelson, Balewa Muhammad, Ezekiel Lewis, J. Que)
 Produced by Timbaland & The Royal Court (King Logan & Jerome Harmon)
 Additional vocals by Ezekiel Lewis

Britney Spears – Blackout – Jive
03. "Radar" (Karlsson, Winnberg, Jonback, Candice Nelson, Balewa Muhammad, Ezekiel Lewis, J. Que)
 Background vocals by Candice Nelson

07. "Freakshow" (Spears, Karlsson, Winnberg, Jonback, Ezekiel Lewis, J. Que)
 Background vocals by Candice Nelson & Ezekiel Lewis
 Both Produced by Bloodshy & Avant & co-produced by The Clutch

Mary J. Blige – Growing Pains – Geffen
00. "Sky Cap" (non-album track)
 Produced by Timbaland

Trey Songz – Trey Day – Atlantic
10. "Store Run" (Neverson, Harris, Davis, Candice Nelson, Balewa Muhammad, Ezekiel Lewis, J. Que)
 Produced by Dre & Vidal
 Background vocals by Candice Nelson
00. "Gon' Go Down" (non-album track) (J. Que, Ezekiel Lewis)

00. "Stayed Down" (non-album track) (J. Que, Ezekiel Lewis)

Menudo – More Than Words – EP – Epic
01. "More Than Words (A E I O U)" (Hills, Candice Nelson, Balewa Muhammad, Ezekiel Lewis, J. Que, Araica)

02. "Mas Que Amor" (A E I O U)"
 Both Produced by Danja Handz & The Clutch

04. "This Christmas" (Hathaway, McKinnor)
 Produced by The Clutch and Cardiff Giants

Miscellaneous
00. "Off" (S. Taylor, Candice Nelson, Balewa Muhammad, Ezekiel Lewis, J. Que)
 Demo track Performed by Candice Nelson
 Produced by Shea Taylor
00. "Ringtone"
 Demo track Performed by Candice Nelson

2008

Miscellaneous
00. "Radar" (Karlsson, Winnberg, Jonback, Candice Nelson, Balewa Muhammad, Ezekiel Lewis, J. Que)
 Demo track Performed by Candice Nelson
 Produced by Bloodshy & Avant
 Placed On Britney Spears' album "Blackout".
00. "Show Me What U Got"
 Demo track Performed by J. Que
00. "100" (Hollis, Woodard, Balewa Muhammad, J. Que, Ezekiel Lewis)
 Demo track Performed by Balewa Muhammad
 Produced by Hit-Boy & Chase N. Cash
 Background vocals by J. Que
00. "Hurt Somebody"
 Demo track Performed by Balewa Muhammad
 Produced by Danja Handz
00. "Taking It Well"
 Demo track Performed by Balewa Muhammad

Danity Kane – Welcome To The Dollhouse – Bad Boy
04. "Pretty Boy" (Hills, Candice Nelson, Balewa Muhammad, Ezekiel Lewis, J. Que)
 Produced by Danja Handz
06. "Sucka For Love" (Cox, Dean, Candice Nelson, Balewa Muhammad, Ezekiel Lewis, J. Que)
 Produced by Bryan Michael Cox, co-produced by Kendrick "WyldCard" Dean & The Clutch
00. "Magnet" (non-album track) (Jabr, Candice Nelson, Balewa Muhammad, Ezekiel Lewis, J. Que)

00. "Representative" (non-album track) (+ Demo by Candice Nelson)
 Both Produced by Bill Jabr

Tiffany Evans – Tiffany Evans – Columbia
01. "Promise Ring" (featuring Ciara) (Crooms, Candice Nelson, Balewa Muhammad, Ezekiel Lewis, J. Que, Reid)
 Produced by Mr. Collipark, The Clutch & Brian "B-Nasty" Reid
07. "Girl Gone Wild" (Kidd, Candice Nelson, Balewa Muhammad, Ezekiel Lewis, J. Que)
 Produced by Brian Kidd & The Clutch
 Background vocals by Candice Nelson
 Additional vocals by Balewa Muhammad & J. Que
08. "About a Boy" (Hudson, Candice Nelson, Balewa Muhammad, Ezekiel Lewis, J. Que)
 Produced by Eric Hudson
 Background vocals by Candice Nelson
 Additional vocals by Balewa Muhammad & Ezekiel Lewis
00. "Lay Back & Chill"  (Original Version) (Hollis, Woodard, Cameron, Latif-Williams, Candice Nelson, Ezekiel Lewis)
 Produced by Hit-Boy & Chase 'N' Cashe
 Album Version removes Candice Nelson & Ezekiel Lewis-written sections, includes additional production from Brandon "B. Carr" Carrier and keyboards by Lamar Edwards.
00. "Whatchutalkinbout" (non-album track) (S. Taylor, Candice Nelson, Balewa Muhammad, Ezekiel Lewis, J. Que)
 Produced by Shea Taylor

Spensha Baker – Out Loud! – Interscope
09. "Hold On" (Baker, Candice Nelson, Keri Hilson, Ezekiel Lewis, J. Que)
 Produced by Bigg D

Raven-Symoné – Raven-Symoné – Hollywood
10. "Keep a Friend" (Suecof, Camper, Candice Nelson, Balewa Muhammad, Ezekiel Lewis, J. Que)
 Produced by Full Scale & The Clutch

13. "Double Dutch Bus" (Smith, Bloom)
 Produced by The Clutch, Additional Production by Bill Jabr
00. "Go To Girl" (non-album track) (Tates, Candice Nelson, Balewa Muhammad, Ezekiel Lewis, J. Que)
 Produced by Kevin Tates

Jesse McCartney – Departure (Japanese Edition) – Hollywood
02. "It's Over" (Kennedy, Candice Nelson, Balewa Muhammad, Ezekiel Lewis, J. Que)

10. "Runnin"  (Kennedy, Candice Nelson, Balewa Muhammad, Ezekiel Lewis, J. Que)
 Both Produced by Brian Kennedy & The Clutch

13. "Bleeding Love" (McCartney, Tedder)
 Produced by The Clutch, co-produced by Bill Jabr

Usher – Here I Stand – LaFace
13. "Appetite" (Raymond, Hills, Balewa Muhammad, Ezekiel Lewis, Araica)
 Produced by Danja Handz

00. "What Happens Here Stays Here" (non-album track) (Mosley, Logan, Harmon, The Clutch – TBD members)
 Produced by Timbaland & The Royal Court – King Logan & Jerome Harmon
 Additional vocals by Ezekiel Lewis

00. "Traffic" (non-album track) (Just Blaze), "Balewa Muhammad", Ezekiel Lewis)
 Produced by Just Blaze

00. "Dirt" (non-album track) (J. Que, Ezekiel Lewis)

00. "Red Cup Affair" (non-album track) (Balewa Muhammad,Ezekiel Lewis)

Noel Gourdin – After My Time – Epic
07. "Reach" (Kadis & Sean, Eziekiel Lewis, Balewa Muhammad, Candice Nelson, J. Que, T.O.)
 Produced by Kadis & Sean
11. "Summertime" (Harris, Davis, Balewa Muhammad, Ezekiel Lewis, "Tab" Nkhereanye, Adams)
 Produced by Dre & Vidal

Karina Pasian – First Love –  Def Jam
00. "Official Girl" (non-album track) (Hills, Candice Nelson, Balewa Muhammad, Ezekiel Lewis)
 Produced by Danja Handz
 Additional vocals by Ezekiel Lewis & Candice Nelson
 Placed On Cassie's second album, title TBD.

Donnie Klang – Just A Rolling Stone – Bad Boy
08. "Catch My Breath" (Hills, Candice Nelson, Balewa Muhammad, Ezekiel Lewis, J. Que)
 Produced by Danja Handz
 Vocal Production by Balewa Muhammad & Mary Brown
 Additional Vocal Production by Daniel "Skid" Mitchell

00. "Defensive" (non-album track) (Winans, Candice Nelson, Balewa Muhammad, Ezekiel Lewis, J. Que)  (+ Demo by Balewa Muhammad)
 Produced by Mario Winans

The Pussycat Dolls – Doll Domination – Interscope
09. "Magic"(Mosley, Harmon, Candice Nelson, Balewa Muhammad, J. Que, Ezekiel Lewis)

10. "Halo" (Mosley, Harmon, Candice Nelson, Balewa Muhammad, J. Que, Ezekiel Lewis)

11. "In Person" (Mosley, Harmon, Candice Nelson, Balewa Muhammad, J. Que, Ezekiel Lewis)

15. "Whatchamacallit" (Mosley, Harmon, Candice Nelson, Balewa Muhammad, J. Que, Ezekiel Lewis)
 All Produced by Timbaland & Jerome "J-Roc" Harmon
 Additional vocals by Candice Nelson

Jennifer Hudson – Jennifer Hudson – J
00. "Depreciate" (non-album track) (J. Que, Ezekiel Lewis)

Britney Spears – Circus – Jive
13. "Radar" (Karlsson, Winnberg, Jonback, Candice Nelson, Balewa Muhammad, Ezekiel Lewis, J. Que)
 Background vocals by Candice Nelson
15. "Phonography" (European Bonus Track) (Karlsson, Winnberg, Jonback, Candice Nelson, Balewa Muhammad, Ezekiel Lewis, J. Que)
 Background vocals by Candice Nelson, Additional vocals by Ezekiel Lewis

17. "Trouble" (iTunes Bonus Track) (Karlsson, Winnberg, Jonback, Candice Nelson, Balewa Muhammad, Ezekiel Lewis, J. Que)
 Background vocals by Candice Nelson
 All Produced by Bloodshy & Avant

00. "Abroad" (non-album track) (Hills, Araica, Candice Nelson, Balewa Muhammad, Ezekiel Lewis, J. Que)

00. "Take The Bait" (non-album track) (Hills, Araica, Candice Nelson, Balewa Muhammad, Ezekiel Lewis, J. Que)
 Both Produced by Danja Handz

Sterling Simms – Yours, Mine & The Truth – Def Jam
00. "By the Hand" (non-album track)
 Produced by Warren "Oak" Felder

Brutha – Brutha – Def Jam / Good Fellas 
00. "Anymore" (non-album track)

00. "Gimme Back" (non-album track)

Lloyd – Lesson In Love – The Inc. Records/ Young Golden  Music
11. Im With It (James Lackey, Ryon Lovette, Keri Hilson)

2009

Miscellaneous
00. "Shoulda Thought About It" (Harris, Davis, Balewa Muhammad, Ezekiel Lewis, Nkhereanye)
 Demo track Performed by Candice Nelson
 Produced by Dre & Vidal

00. "Choke"
 Demo track Performed by Balewa Muhammad

00. "Over Here"
 Demo track Performed by Balewa Muhammad

Chris Cornell – Scream – Interscope / MMG
01. "Part Of Me" (Cornell, Mosley, Ezekiel Lewis, Balewa Muhammad)

02. "Time" (Cornell, Mosley, Ezekiel Lewis, Balewa Muhammad, Washington)

06. "Never Far Away" (Cornell, Mosley, Ezekiel Lewis, Balewa Muhammad, Washington)

08. "Long Gone" (Cornell, Mosley, Ezekiel Lewis, J. Que, Balewa Muhammad)

10. "Enemy" (Cornell, Mosley, Ezekiel Lewis, Balewa Muhammad, Tedder)

00. "Love Comes Down" (non-album track) (Cornell, Mosley, Ezekiel Lewis, Balewa Muhammad)
 All Produced by Timbaland

04. "Get Up" (Cornell, Mosley, Harmon, Ezekiel Lewis, Balewa Muhammad, James Fauntleroy)

00. "Do Me Wrong" (non-album track) (Cornell, Mosley, Harmon, J. Que, Ezekiel Lewis, Balewa Muhammad, James Fauntleroy, Ryan Tedder)

00. "Long Gone" (alternate version) (Cornell, Mosley, Harmon, Ezekiel Lewis, J. Que, Balewa Muhammad)
 Produced by Timbaland & Jerome "J-Roc" Harmon

Keri Hilson – In a Perfect World… – Interscope / MMG / Zone 4
04. "Return The Favor" (featuring Timbaland) (Mosley, Keri Hilson, Candice Nelson, Balewa Muhammad, Ezekiel Lewis, J. Que)
 Produced by Timbaland
Other TBA titles

Ciara – Fantasy Ride – LaFace / Jive
04. "Turntables" (featuring Chris Brown) (Marcella Araica, C. Brown, C. Harris, N. Washington, Candice Nelson, Jim Beanz)
Produced by Danja

14. "Echo" (Candice Nelson, Patrick Smith, Ezekiel Lewis, Balewa Muhammad, C. Harris)
Produced by Danja

Esmée Denters – Outta Here  – Tennman

Ginuwine – A Man's Thoughts – Warner Bros. Records
08. "Get Involved" (featuring Timbaland, Missy Elliott) (Lumpkin, Mosley, Harmon, J. Que, Ezekiel Lewis)
Produced by Timbaland & Jerome "J-Roc" Harmon

Justin Bieber – My World – Island Records
05. "One Less Lonely Girl" (Usher Raymond, Sean Hamilton Ezekiel Lewis, Balewa Muhammad)
Produced by Ezekiel Lewis, Balewa Muhammad, and Sean Hamilton

Future Projects

Toni Braxton – TBD – Atlantic
00. If I Was Sane
 Produced by Midi Mafia

Teairra Marí – At That Point – Warner Bros. (expected release: TBA)
00. "Sponsor" (LRoc, Balewa Muhammad, Ezekiel Lewis, Hadiya Nelson)
 Produced by Ezekiel Lewis, Balewa Muhammad & LRoc

Cassie – King of Hearts – Bad Boy (expected release: TBA)
00. "Official Girl" (Hills, Candice Nelson, Balewa Muhammad, Ezekiel Lewis) (+ Single Version featuring Lil Wayne)
 Produced by Danja Handz
 Additional vocals by Ezekiel Lewis & Candice Nelson

Teyana Taylor – From a Planet Called Harlem – Star Trak (expected release: TBA)
00. "Translation"  (Hollis, Candice Nelson, Balewa Muhammad, Ezekiel Lewis, J. Que)

00. "Hey Young Girl" (Hollis, Candice Nelson, Ezekiel Lewis, J. Que, Jeffers) (featuring Eve)

00. "Color Me Pink" (Hollis, Candice Nelson, J. Que, Ezekiel Lewis)

00. "Complicated" (Hollis, Candice Nelson, J. Que)
 All Produced by Hit-Boy

00. "Nah Mean"  (Crawford, Candice Nelson, Balewa Muhammad, Ezekiel Lewis, J. Que)
 Produced by Shondrae "Bangladesh" Crawford

Unreleased & TBD Projects

3LW – Point of No Return (shelved album) – So So Def
00. "Things You Never Hear" (Coleman, Keri Hilson, J. Que)
 Produced by Melvin "St. Nick" Coleman
 Background vocals by Keri Hilson

Menudo – shelved album – Epic (expected release: 2009)
00. "Save The Day" (Hills, Candice Nelson, Balewa Muhammad, Ezekiel Lewis, J. Que)

00. "Surrounded" (Hills, Candice Nelson, Balewa Muhammad, Ezekiel Lewis, J. Que)

00. "Young Lovers" (Hills, Balewa Muhammad, Ezekiel Lewis, J. Que)
 All Produced by Danja Handz & The Clutch

00. "Who U Run 2" (Khayat, Candice Nelson, Balewa Muhammad, Ezekiel Lewis, J. Que)
 Produced by Red One

00. "Inside Out" (Kennedy, Candice Nelson, Balewa Muhammad, Ezekiel Lewis, J. Que)

00. "Pillow" (Kennedy, Candice Nelson, Ezekiel Lewis, J. Que)
 Both Produced by Brian Kennedy

One Chance – shelved album – J Records / US
00. "No Brainer"
 Produced by Warren "Oak" Felder

CJ – TBD – Capitol
00. "Fresh Pair Of Panties" (J. Que, Ezekiel Lewis)

00. "Tongue Twista" (J. Que, Ezekiel Lewis)

Southern Girl – TBD – Warner Bros. Records
00. "Like You Love It" (J. Que, Ezekiel Lewis)

00. "On Your Hood" (J. Que, Ezekiel Lewis)

Erika Rivera – TBD – Atlantic
00. "Here I Am" (Harrison, Candice Nelson, Keri Hilson, Balewa Muhammad, Ezekiel Lewis, J. Que)
 Produced by Rich Harrison
00. "Register" (Holmes, Candice Nelson, Balewa Muhammad, Ezekiel Lewis, J. Que)
 Produced by San "Chez" Holmes

Chapter 4 (formerly 3rd Storee) – shelved album – J
00. "2 Piece Juicy"
 Produced by Danja Handz

Megan Rochell – You, Me & The Radio (shelved album) – Def Jam
"You, Me, and The Radio" (written by Ezekiel "Zeke" Lewis)

00. "It's On You" (Dixon, Keri Hilson, J. Que)

00. "Who Are They" (Dixon, Keri Hilson, J. Que)
 Both Produced by Antonio Dixon

00. "Outta My Mind" (Medor, Nesmith, J. Que, Keri Hilson, Hale, "Tab" Nkhereanye)
 Produced by The Corna Boyz

Se'cret – TBD – M11 Ent.
00. "Driveway"

The Goods – TBD – formerly The Clutch, Ent.

Nikki Flores – This Girl – Epic
00. "Beautiful Boy" (Hills, Candice Nelson, Balewa Muhammad, Ezekiel Lewis, J. Que)

00. "Suffocate" (Hills, Candice Nelson, Balewa Muhammad, Ezekiel Lewis, J. Que)

00. "Painkiller" (Hills, Candice Nelson, Balewa Muhammad, Ezekiel Lewis, J. Que)
 All Produced by Danja Handz

Cristal Q. – TBD – Atlantic
00. "None Of That" (Scheffer, J. Que, Ezekiel Lewis, Candice Nelson)

00. "Impala" (Scheffer, Candice Nelson, J. Que, Ezekiel Lewis)
 Background vocals by Candice Nelson
 Both Produced by Jim Jonsin

00. "Watch This" (J. Que, Ezekiel Lewis, Candice Nelson)

00. "Let Me Go" (Candice Nelson, J. Que, Ezekiel Lewis)
 Background vocals by Candice Nelson

00. "Can't Get That" (J. Que, Ezekiel Lewis)

00. "Curfew" (J. Que, Ezekiel Lewis)

00. "I Can Tell" (J. Que, Ezekiel Lewis)

00. "Shake It Harder" (J. Que, Ezekiel Lewis)

Paula Campbell – I Am Paula Campbell – Epic
00. "Hit List" (Kidd, Candice Nelson, Keri Hilson, Ezekiel Lewis, J. Que)
 Produced by Brian Kidd
 Background vocals by Candice Nelson
00. "Upkeep" (Bunton, Cole, Candice Nelson)
 Produced by JB & Corron & The Clutch

Bayje – Curious – Atlantic
00. "Jealous Of A Whip" (Suecof, Candice Nelson, Keri Hilson, Balewa Muhammad, Ezekiel Lewis, J. Que)

00. "I Give Up" (Suecof, Candice Nelson, Ezekiel Lewis, J. Que)

00. "Mean Girls" (Suecof, Candice Nelson, Ezekiel Lewis, J. Que)
 All Produced by Infinity

00. "Problem" (Kidd, Candice Nelson, Balewa Muhammad, Ezekiel Lewis, J. Que)
 Background vocals by Candice Nelson

00. "Occupied" (Kidd, Candice Nelson, Ezekiel Lewis, J. Que)

00. "Wait" (Kidd, Candice Nelson, Balewa Muhammad, Ezekiel Lewis, J. Que)
 All Produced by Brian Kidd

00. "My Space" (Harris, Davis, Candice Nelson, Balewa Muhammad, Ezekiel Lewis, J. Que)
 Produced by Dre & Vidal

LeMarvin – TBD – Motown
00. "New Body Style" (Perez, Balewa Muhammad, Ezekiel Lewis, J. Que, Nkhereanye)
 Produced by Happy Perez, co-produced by The Clutch
00. "New Body Style (Alternate Version)" (Cain, Balewa Muhammad, Ezekiel Lewis, J. Que, Nkhereanye)
 Produced by Needlz (Khari Cain), co-produced by The Clutch
00. "All" (Colapietro, Dinkins, Candice Nelson, Keri Hilson, Balewa Muhammad, Ezekiel Lewis, J. Que)

00. "In The Air" (Colapietro, Dinkins, Candice Nelson, Keri Hilson, Balewa Muhammad, Ezekiel Lewis, J. Que)
 Both Produced by The Co-Stars
00. "Not My Day" (Thiam, Candice Nelson, Balewa Muhammad, Ezekiel Lewis, J. Que)
 Produced by Akon

Dear Jayne – Voice Message – Capitol
00. "Automatic" (Stewart, Candice Nelson, Keri Hilson, Balewa Muhammad, Ezekiel Lewis, J. Que)
 Produced by Tricky Stewart

Missez – TBD – Geffen
00. "Hangover" (Cox, Candice Nelson, Ezekiel Lewis, J. Que)

00. "Only One U" (non-album track) (Cox, Nkhereanye, Candice Nelson, Balewa Muhammad, Ezekiel Lewis)
 Placed On Fantasia's album "Fantasia".
 Both Produced by Bryan-Michael Cox

Melissa Jiménez – Signed, Sealed, Delivered – SRC / Universal Motown
00. "Wrong When You're Gone" (non-album track) (Baker, Candice Nelson, Keri Hilson', Ezekiel Lewis, J. Que)
 Produced by Bigg D & The Clutch
 Placed On Jennifer Lopez's album "Brave".

Sophia Fresh (formerly Girlfriends) – TBD – Atlantic / Nappy Boy Ent. (formerly J)
00. "I'm Sprung" (J. Que, Ezekiel Lewis)

00. "Shame On Love" (Dixon, Thomas, Dawkins, Ripoll, Candice Nelson, J. Que, Ezekiel Lewis) 
 Produced by Antonio Dixon

00. Other TBD Titles

Dana Lee – TBD
00. "Perfect World" (Medor, Nesmith, Hale, Keri Hilson, J. Que)
 Produced by The Corna Boyz

Jordyn Taylor – TBD
00. "Won't Play Nice"
 Background vocals by Candice Nelson

Money - Unlady Like – Blackground

Jada – TBA – Universal / Motown
00. "Denial"  (Hills, Candice Nelson, Balewa Muhammad, Ezekiel Lewis, J. Que, Araica)
 Produced by Danja Handz
 Other Tracks TBD

Miscellaneous (ASCAP Registered)
 "Fit Like That" (Title Code: 362343037) – (Baker, Candice Nelson, Balewa Muhammad, Ezekiel Lewis)
 "Hold On" (Title Code: 382408313) – (Baker, Candice Nelson, Keri Hilson, Ezekiel Lewis, J. Que)
 Both Produced by Bigg D
 "Can't Shake Ya" (Title Code: 331362155) – (Stewart, "Tab" Nkhereanye, Keri Hilson, J. Que)
 Produced by Tricky Stewart
 "Get Myself Together" (Title Code: 371198213) – (Smith, Candice Nelson, Keri Hilson, Ezekiel Lewis, J. Que)
 "Good Look" (Title Code: 371198277) – (Smith, Candice Nelson, Keri Hilson, Ezekiel Lewis, J. Que)
 "Gotta Know" (Title Code: 371198311) – (Smith, Keri Hilson, Ezekiel Lewis, J. Que)
 "Say" (Title Code: 493677993) – (Smith, Candice Nelson, Keri Hilson, Ezekiel Lewis, J. Que)
 All Produced by Lil Jon
 "Greenlight" (Title Code: 371198339) – (Jones, Candice Nelson, Keri Hilson, Ezekiel Lewis, J. Que)
 "Move It Like This" (Title Code: 432134013) – (Jones, Candice Nelson, Keri Hilson, Ezekiel Lewis, J. Que)
 Both Produced by Polow da Don
 "Letcha" (Title Code: 421918554) – (Cox, Candice Nelson, Keri Hilson, Ezekiel Lewis, J. Que)
 Produced by Bryan-Michael Cox
 "She Ain't Me" (Title Code: 493678072) – (Kidd, Candice Nelson, Keri Hilson, Ezekiel Lewis, J. Que, Newt)
 Produced by Brian Kidd
 "My Team" (Karlsson, Winnberg, Candice Nelson, Balewa Muhammad, Ezekiel Lewis, J. Que)
 Produced by Bloodshy & Avant
 "Time Of My Life" (Title Code: 503095912) – (Jerkins, Keri Hilson, Balewa Muhammad, J. Que)
 Produced by Fred "Uncle Freddie" Jerkins III
 "What Love Can Do" (Title Code: 530986971) – (Medor, Nesmith, Keri Hilson, J. Que)
 Produced by The Corna Boyz
 "The Position" (Title Code: 503095654) – (Holland, Candice Nelson, Ezekiel Lewis)
 Produced by Kwamé "K-1" Holland
 "Whatcha Here For" (Title Code: 531782117) – (Holmes, Candice Nelson, Balewa Muhammad, Ezekiel Lewis, J. Que, "Tab" Nkhereanye)
 Produced by San "Chez" Holmes
 "Ain't You" (Title Code: 311346353) – (Lang, Keri Hilson, J. Que, Hamler)
 Produced by Flash Technology
 "Little Bit" – (Harrison, Candice Nelson, Balewa Muhammad, Ezekiel Lewis, J. Que)
 Produced by Rich Harrison
 "Monolopy Money" (Suecof, Candice Nelson, Balewa Muhammad, Ezekiel Lewis, J. Que)
 Produced by Infinity
 "Next Best Thing" (Hudson, Candice Nelson, Balewa Muhammad, Ezekiel Lewis)
 Produced by Eric Hudson
 "Rock" (Hollis, Candice Nelson, Balewa Muhammad, Ezekiel Lewis, J. Que)
 "The Introduction" (Hollis, Candice Nelson, Balewa Muhammad, Ezekiel Lewis, J. Que)
 Both Produced by Hit-Boy
 "Time Will Tell" (Hills, Candice Nelson, Balewa Muhammad, Ezekiel Lewis, J. Que)
 Produced by Danja Handz
 "What It's Like" (Warner, Candice Nelson, Balewa Muhammad, Ezekiel Lewis, J. Que)
 "Who Knows" (Warner, Candice Nelson, Balewa Muhammad, Ezekiel Lewis, J. Que)
 Both Produced by Michael Warner
 "I Want 'Em All" (Colapietro, Dinkins, Jr., Candice Nelson, Keri Hilson, Balewa Muhammad, Ezekiel Lewis, J. Que)
 Produced by The Co-Stars

Miscellaneous (BMI Registered)
 "Be Like That" (BMI Work #8438718) – (Colapietro, Dinkins, Candice Nelson, Keri Hilson, Balewa Muhammad)
 Produced by The Co-Stars
 "Better" (BMI Work #8714988) – (Schack, Karlin, Keri Hilson, J. Que)
 Produced by Soulshock & Karlin
 "Dream" (BMI Work #8348634) – (T. Taylor, Candice Nelson, Balewa Muhammad, Ezekiel Lewis, J. Que)
 Produced by Troy Taylor
 "Notice Me" (BMI Work #8405518) – (Harrison, Candice Nelson, Keri Hilson, Balewa Muhammad, Ezekiel Lewis, J. Que)
 Produced by Rich Harrison

Miscellaneous (Harry Fox Registered)
 "Paper Man" (Kidd, Balewa Muhammad, J. Que)
 Produced by Brian Kidd

References

Production discographies
Hip hop discographies
Discographies of American artists